Eutaw Municipal Airport  is a city-owned, public-use airport located two nautical miles (4 km) southeast of the central business district of Eutaw, a city in Greene County, Alabama, United States. As of 8 December 2017, the airport is indefinitely closed.

History 
Eutaw Municipal Airport was built in April 1940, and it opened in the same month.

Facilities and aircraft 
Eutaw Municipal Airport covers an area of 48 acres (19 ha) at an elevation of 170 feet (52 m) above mean sea level. It has one runway designated 16/34 with an asphalt surface measuring 3,600 by 80 feet (1,097 x 24 m). For the 12-month period ending November 5, 2008, the airport had 6,420 general aviation aircraft operations, an average of 17 per day.

See also 
 List of airports in Alabama

References

External links 
 Aerial image as of 25 January 1992 from USGS The National Map

Airports in Alabama
Transportation buildings and structures in Greene County, Alabamal